Daryasar Rural District is a rural district (dehestan) in Kumeleh District, Langarud County, Gilan Province, Iran. At the 2006 census, its population was 10,508, in 3,049 families. The rural district has 9 villages.

References 

Rural Districts of Gilan Province
Langarud County